Pasir Ris Bus Interchange is a bus interchange located at Pasir Ris in the eastern part of Singapore. It is located off Pasir Ris Drive 3, adjacent to Pasir Ris MRT station and near White Sands Shopping Centre. This bus interchange also serves as a pick-up/drop-off point for shuttle buses ferrying NSF men heading to the SAF Ferry Terminal for their shuttle ferry to Pulau Tekong.

History
The interchange was built at a cost of S$2.7 million and opened on 10 December 1989, along with the Eunos Bus Interchange. The interchange provides bus connections around the Pasir Ris estate. Bus Service 403 was the first bus route in Pasir Ris from 1979, which previously terminated at Tampines Road terminus before being amended to the current route of looping at Pasir Ris Road.

Bus Contracting Model

Under the new bus contracting model, all the bus routes operating in the interchange were split into 5 route packages - Bus Service 5 under Bukit Merah, Bus Service 58 under Serangoon-Eunos, Bus Service 46 under Bedok, Bus Services 21 and 88 under Bishan-Toa Payoh and the rest under the Loyang Bus Package operated by Go-Ahead Singapore. Services under the Loyang Bus Package started operations on 18 September 2016.

Redevelopment
Redevelopment of Pasir Ris Bus Interchange has started since 2019. The bus interchange underwent a reconfiguration on 3 July 2021, after which the western half of the old bus interchange will be demolished to facilitate the construction of the Pasir Ris Integrated Transport Hub and Pasir Ris Rail Turnback, which will be completed by 2028, two years before the Cross Island MRT line starts operations. The reconfigured interchange began operations on 3 July 2021 with inclusive facilities built as part of the relocation. The facility will remain in operation until 2028.

References

External links
 Interchanges and Terminals (SBS Transit)

Bus stations in Singapore
Pasir Ris